Jeffrey Allen Wallace (born April 12, 1976) is a retired Major League Baseball pitcher. He was drafted by the Kansas City Royals in the 25th round of the 1995 amateur draft. He works at Leslie Equipment Company in West Virginia.

References
"Jeff Wallace Statistics". The Baseball Cube. 11 January 2008.
"Jeff Wallace Statistics". Baseball-Reference. 11 January 2008.

1976 births
Living people
Pittsburgh Pirates players
Tampa Bay Devil Rays players
Major League Baseball pitchers
Baseball players from West Virginia
Nashville Sounds players
Carolina Mudcats players
Durham Bulls players
Gulf Coast Royals players
Lansing Lugnuts players
Lynchburg Hillcats players
Orlando Rays players
Pawtucket Red Sox players
Sarasota Red Sox players